Transport for Victoria is a statutory office of the Department of Transport that is responsible for the planning and coordination of all transport systems in Victoria, Australia.

It acts as an umbrella agency for Public Transport Victoria (PTV, the statutory authority that manages all public transit in Victoria, including trains, trams and buses) and VicRoads (the statutory authority that manages Victoria's roads).

History
The formation of Transport for Victoria was jointly announced on 27 June 2016, by Jacinta Allan, Minister for Public Transport, and Luke Donnellan, Minister for Roads.

At the time, the government anticipated that TFV would eventually become a single point of information for travel within Victoria, as well as a coordinating agency for the planning of transport infrastructure.

Adam Carey, writing in The Age, suggested that the new authority would only undermine the role of the then recently established PTV as an umbrella agency.

The organization became operational in April 2017 to realise the principal objectives of the Transport Integration Act 2010.

At the start of 2019, TFV became part of the newly established Department of Transport.

Head, Transport for Victoria
The office for the head of Transport for Victoria, officially Head, Transport for Victoria, is a statutory office established under section 64A of the Transport Integration Act 2010. The head plays a key strategic role in ensuring Victoria's growing transport system is integrated and coordinated. After the establishment of Department of Transport, the secretary of Department of Transport, currently Paul Younis, also holds the position of acting head of TfV.

References

External links
Transport For Victoria website

Government agencies of Victoria (Australia)
Public transport in Melbourne
Transport in Victoria (Australia)
2017 establishments in Australia
Intermodal transport authorities in Australia